The 2010–11 Spanish football season is Real Valladolid's first season in the second level in Spanish football since the historical 2006–07 season, in which the team promoted to La Liga with 88 points. After the salvation attempt of the previous season, Javier Clemente was sacked on 23 June 2010, before the pre-season. Antonio Gómez, Rafael Benítez's former assistant and the former coach of Albacete B, was the new team coach for the 2010–11 season but he was sacked on 29 November 2010 after the defeat against Cartagena in Nuevo José Zorrilla. Javier Torres Gómez was the provisional manager between 29 November and 5 December, earning a point at Barcelona Atlètic's Mini Estadi. After that, Abel Resino was named new team coach in the afternoon of 5 December.

Trophies balance

Competitive balance

Summer transfers

In

Out

Loan in

Loan out

Loan return

Loan end

Testing players

Winter transfers

In

Out

Loan in

Loan out

Loan return

Loan end

Current squad

Squad

Youth system

Nominated by their national football team

Match stats

Match results

Pre-season and friendly tournaments

Friendly matches

Copa Castilla y León 2009–10

The final of this tournament had to be played on April 23, 2010, the Castilla y León's day, but as both finalists had some problems in their leagues (Real Valladolid in Liga BBVA, finally relegated, and Salamanca in Liga Adelante), the final was postponed to the 2010–11 season.

Copa Castilla y León 2010–11

13th Ramón Losada Trophy

Liga Adelante

 Win   Draw   Lost

 Liga Adelante Winner (also promoted)
 Direct promotion to Liga BBVA
 Liga BBVA promotion play-offs
 Relegation to Segunda División B

With Antonio Gómez

With Javier Torres Gómez

With Abel Resino

Promotion Play-off 
Final winners were promoted to Liga BBVA. Granada and Celta Vigo played the other Semifinal.

Semifinal 

Elche won 3–2 on aggregate and qualified for the Promotion play-off Final. Real Valladolid stays in Liga Adelante.

Copa del Rey

Second Qualifying Round

Third Qualifying Round

Round of 32

Espanyol won 3–1 on aggregate.

Others

TV Partners 

Real Valladolid's image rights stop belonging (from this season) to the group Prisa, proof of this is the broadcast of  the matchday 1 against Villarreal B by GolT (Mediapro) and the second qualifying round of Copa del Rey by MARCA TV (Mediapro), this being the first football match broadcast by the TV channel born in August 2010.

LFP failed strike

Caso Ferreira 

Caso Ferreira is the name given by Valladolid press to the lived scandal because of FIFA at Winter. During the Winter transfer window, Real Valladolid made official the transfer of the Uruguayan striker (who played in Bolivian Club Bolívar) William Ferreira during the night of January 31 to February 1, at the last hours of the transfer window. Once the player had moved to the city, after being introduced as a new signing and when he was about to be convened in early February, FIFA told Real Valladolid that the transfer had been completed after the deadline ended up, after 23:59 CEST on 31 January. Although Real Valladolid tried to prove it was a computer error, coming to claim the Higher Arbitration Court, his request was denied and the player was forced to return to Bolivia. Carlos Suárez, Real Valladolid president, said that he didn't rule out further bids for the striker in Summer, and was very unhappy with FIFA.

References

External links

2010-11
Spanish football clubs 2010–11 season